Ullaasayaathra is a 1975 Indian Malayalam film, directed by A. B. Raj and produced by Ravikumar. The film stars Jayan, Sheela, Lakshmi, Sukumari and KPAC Lalitha in the lead roles. The film has musical score by M. S. Viswanathan.

Cast
 
Jayan 
Sheela 
Sukumari 
KPAC Lalitha 
Adoor Bhasi 
Jose Prakash 
Lakshmi 
Pattom Sadan 
Prameela 
RaviKumar
Krishnan Nair
Sukumaran 
Bahadoor 
Jameela Malik 
Leela
M. G. Soman 
Paravoor Soman
Priyan
Rani Chandra 
Ravi Menon 
Ravikumar 
S. P. Pillai 
Shailaj 
Sinbad
Thenmozhi

Soundtrack
The music was composed by M. S. Viswanathan and the lyrics were written by Sreekumaran Thampi.

References

External links
 

1975 films
1970s Malayalam-language films
Films scored by M. S. Viswanathan